Prabhas Patan, also known as Somnath Patan or Prabhas Kshetra, historically named Dev Patan, is an area situated in Veraval, Gir Somnath district in Saurashtra region of Gujarat, India. Somnath temple, a place of pilgrimage due to its importance as Jyotirlinga site dedicated to Shiva, is located here.

Places of interest

Junagadh Gate  is the prime gateway to Somnath. One enters the temple town from the city Veraval through this gate. This is a triple gate with historical significance and is an ancient structure which was built centuries back. This gate has many intricate carvings on the walls. It is through this gate that the foreign invader Mahmud Gazni broke in to enter the holy city and destroyed the temples in the town and looted the great wealth.

Daityasudan or Daityusudan temple - is an ancient one with an image of Vishnu from the 7th century AD. It is located close to Somanath Mahadev temple, Northerly. Chandraprabh Swami Jain temple lays adjacent to this temple.

Mahakali temple - lies close Somnath Mahadev temple. It was built by Queen Ahalyabai Holkar of Indore in 1783 AD. Other spots in the temple are Shri Kapardi Vinayak and Shri Hanuman Temple in addition to Vallabhghat. Vallabhghat is a beautiful sunset point.

Archaeological museum [Prabas Patan Museum] [open from 8:30am – 12:15pm and 2:30pm - 6pm] - Down the lane to the north of the temple is a museum with important archaeological remains from the former Somnath Temple. Though lacking in proper documentation or guidebooks, the time spent here is worth the journey, with the remains of the ancient shrine reconstructed by the Chalukyan Maharaja Shri Mularaja Deva Solanki of Anhilvada Patan. To some, the museum is even more interesting than the modern temple, for it preserves stone sculptures, inscriptions and pottery from several periods.

Places of interest along Triveni Sangam, Snanghat and River Hiren - listed anticlockwise as one drives from Somnath Mahadev main entrance gate

Balaji Mandir – Brahma kund and Saraswati Devi temple  - Somnath beach - Harihara Van – Rudralay Mahadev Temple – Parashuramji Temple - Cremation Yard - Kali Mandir– Triveni Ghat; Dehotsarg; Baldev Gufa – Kamnath Mahadev Mandir and Sharada Mutt – Suraj or Surya mandir – Panch Pandav Gufa or Hinglaj Mata Gufa – Gita Mandir – Lakshminarayan Temple – Kasi Vishvanath mandir - Betthakji of Mahaprabuhji – Bhimnath Mahadev – Jain temple – Dholeshwar Mahadev Mandir

Balaji Temple – built in Dravidian style is located close to the Main circle leading to Somnath Mandir

Brahma kund and Saraswati Devi temple – are located close to Somnath beach

Somnath Beach – is a nice one, located close to Somnath Mahadev temple. Beach offers an escape into the roaring silence of nature, yet swimming here is not recommended. One can enjoy little snacks here, and explore beach side on a camel ride.

Harihar Van – is a nice garden along Triveni sangam

Rudralay Mahadev or Rudresvara Temple – Built in 11th or 13th century AD is located to left of the road to Triveni Ghat

Parsuram or Parshuram Temple – located to the right of the road to triveni sangam, opposite to Rudralay temple, is popular among devotees. Lord Parshuram, the son of Goddess Renuka and a pious sage Jamadagni is believed to be the sixth incarnation of Lord Vishnu and one of the seven immortals (chiranjiv) as stated in Hindu mythology. This locale is believed to be the very place where Lord Parshuram had performed a severe penance in the honor of Lord Somnath in order to get rid of the sin committing Kshatriya Vadh. The Parshuram Temple of Triveni Tirtha happens to be one of the rare temples dedicated to Lord Parshuram. This baroque temple adjoined by two ancient bathing water tanks (holy kunds) is a much sought after religious destination where devotees spend time in prayers and meditation. The temple edifice is divided into three sub structures; sabha mandap, central mandap and a garbhagriha. The garbhagriha of this shrine houses the idol of Lord Parshuram sided by two idols of Kala and Kama. The temple complex also comprises the sub shrines dedicated to Lord Hanuman and Lord Ganesha. Additionally, a smaller shrine consecrating the Goddess Renuka is also positioned behind the main temple. Endowed with its religious and mythological significance as well as its charismatic scenic background, this temple is much frequented by the devotees and the tourists all round the year.

Cremation yard or Smashan Ghat – is located adjacent to Parsuramji temple.

Kali Mandir – located on Western end of Triveni ghat behind Parshuramji Mandir, on Triveni check-dam road.

Triveni sangam; SnanGhat; Dehotsarg or Shri Krishna Nija Dham Prasthan Tirth;  Baldev Gufa

Triveni Sangam Snanghat of Somnath established at the confluence of the three holy rivers Saraswati, Kapil and Hiran is a sacrosanct locale highly revered by Hindus as the Moksha Teerth. This is the place where the three blessed rivers flow into the Arabian Sea. As the sea is the ultimate destination of a river, obtaining Moksha is the ultimate goal of the human life. The three rivers Saraswati, Kapil and Hiran stand for the three stages of the life; birth, life and death. Triveni Sangam Snanghat is the sacred site for taking a divine and sin cleansing dip in the Triveni Sangam. Apart from that, this Snanghat is also acclaimed as the place where ‘Pitru - tarpana’ can be offered to your departed ancestors. Triveni Ghat has a significant place in Hindu Mythology and Puranas. It is believed that Lord Krishna walked to this holy spot after he was struck by an arrow shot by Jara, a hunter in Bhalka tirth. This is a highly revered place in Somnath. This location is a very peaceful and amazing, yet underrated - Many famous temples are located on the banks of Triveni Ghat.
 
Dehotsarg - Krishna, reclining under a pipal tree was shot in the foot by a Bhil huntsman named Jara who had mistaken him for a deer. Limping a long way eastward, Shri Krishna reached the bank of the river Hiranya just above the triveni sangam, and breathed his last in a small cave. His body was taken to the triveni sangam and cremated there. The site where he was shot is known as Bhalka Tirtha, and the site of his cremation, near a temple to Maha Kali, is called Dehotsarg. The term ‘Dehotsarg’ means ‘leaving the body’. Lord Krishna took his journey to Nija Dham [permanent abode] from Dehotsarg Teerth leaving behind his mortal body, hence is also called as Golak Dham Teerth or Shri Krishna Nija Dham Tirth. Ahir community women of this area wear black even to this day symbolizing mourning at his death. Dehotsarg is located on the bank of river Hiran which is about 1½ km from Somnath Temple. Krishna's footprint in marble is made at this place and named as "Golok Dham". The place is in an open area and very peaceful. The tranquil water of river Hiran and trees make the place very lovely.

Balramji ki Gufa (Baldev Gufa or Dauji - ni - Gufa) - Balarama the elder brother of Lord Sri Krishna was all through accompanying Sri Krishna in His final journey. After witnessing the Niryana of Lord Sri Krishna, Balarama (Aadisesha Avathara) cast off his human form and left for his abode from a nearby place in his original serpent form. This place is marked by an ancient holy cave known as Dauji - ni - Gufa where you can find the mark of Aadisesha depicted on the cave wall from where he said to have departed. This place is adjacent to the place of Sri Krishna’s Niryana.

The Kamnath Mahadev Temple and Sharda peet – Built about 200 years ago by a Mayurdhwaj King, Kamnath Mahadev is a renowned temple located in Somnath, opposite to triveni sangam, close to suraj mandir. This is a large temple complex with a holy pond known as Dudhiyu Talav, water well known as Gangvo Kuvo and a bathing pool named as Mahadev no Kund. It is believed that Mayurdhwaj King recovered from leprosy after taking bath in this place, and devotees to this day take dip in this water for its healing powers. There is a saying in Gujarat, "He who does not bath at the Kund is as good as dead or is a living dead". A huge temple of the main deity, Kamnath, occupies the center surrounded by many small structures. It is believed that ages ago Shiva had reduced Kama to ashes by unleashing the fury of his third eye, hence the name Kamanath. In the interiors, there is a long, narrow cave where Adi Shankaracharya meditated for years. A spectacular presentation of all the twelve jyotirlings of Shiva is shown at the opening of this cave.

Suraj Mandir - also popularly known as Sun Temple, in Somnath is also an ancient temple dating back to the origin of Somnath temple. This temple is situated at the north of the Triveni Ghat. The temple architecture is amazing with many images of elephants, lions and other birds and animals. There is also a step well in the temple premises. This temple too was attacked many a times by Muslim foreign invaders.

Panch Pandava Gufa [Hinglaj Mata Gufa] - established near Lalghati in Somnath, close to Suraj Mandir is a cave temple that was expanded to present form in 1949 by the late Baba Narayandas. The pandav brothers, during their exile, are believed to have done penance in the caves in order to impress lord Shiva. Pandav brothers also worshiped Hinglaj Mataji along with lord Shiva here. Old temple might have been built around 15th century. Positioned at an elevated locus on a small hillock and offering the panoramic prospects of the adjoining Somnath town and the Sea, this temple is dedicated to the five Pandava brothers [narrow steps lead to the cave and temple]. Apart from the idols of Pandavas, this temple also enshrines the idols of Lord Shiva, Goddess Durga, Lord Rama, Devi Sita, Laxman and Hanuman. Set up amidst the picturesque milieu and the calm and cool spiritual ambiance, the Panch Pandava Gufa temple also accommodates a Sanskrit college in its premises.  Cave here is also referred as Aravalem caves; another namesake cave located in Goa is very popular]

Temples along Hiren river, further upstream -

Gita Mandir, Somnath  - also known as Birla Mandir, placed at the confluence of three holy rivers known as Triveni Tirtha, is a Krishna temple built by Birla family in 1970. As the legend goes, the Gita Mandir is nested at the very exact spot where Lord Sri Krishna after being shot by a hunter at the Bhalka Teerth had rested for a while before departing for His ‘Neej Dham’ at Dehotsarg. Lord Krishna with his bleeding foot is said to have walked about 4 km from Bhalka Teerth to this location.  Marvelously built in polished marble stone, the Gita Mandir enshrines the idol of Lord Krishna in its sanctum. This idol of the presiding deity is flanked by two statues of Lord Laxminarayan and Lord SitaRam. The footprint of Lord Shri Krishna is carved here to mark the divine memory of Shri Krishna Neejdham Prasthan Leela. The most remarkable aspect of the Gita Mandir is its eighteen marble pillars that bear the 18 Adhyays of Shrimad Bhagwat Geeta carved on them. The interiors of the temple are decorated with several paintings depicting various life episodes of Lord Krishna. The Gita Mandir is constructed in such a way that any sound made within the temple is echoed. As a result, the Krishna Bhajans and Stotras recited inside the temple echo in the environment and create a spiritual appeal.

Lakshminarayan Temple, Somnath - located adjacent to the Gita Mandir along river Hiren is dedicated to Lord Vishnu and Goddess Laxmi. Positioned along the pristine Beachside this Mandir is revered for enshrining the divine ‘Shree vigraha’ of Bhagwan Laxminarayan. Supposed to be fashioned after the Laxminarayan Temple of Badrinath, this temple is built in modern Indian style of architecture. This daunting structure erected in glossy marbles and ornamented with beautiful carvings and engravings is distinguished for its commanding architectonics. The carvings on the temple walls depict the episodes chronicled in the Hindu Puranas. Apart from the idol of Lord Laxminarayan, this temple also enshrines several other idols of various Hindu Gods and Goddesses.

Kashi Vishwanath Mahadev temple – located close to Lakshminarayan temple is small, yet ancient.

Shree Mahaprabhuji Bethakji  -  is located close to Gita Mandir. At the Dehotsargt Tirth Shri Vallabhacharya gave discourses on Shrimad Bhagvat Gita for seven days, and this place is 65th of such 84 bethakjis.

Bhimnath Mahadev – located little North of Gita Mandir is yet another small ancient temple, which was ransacked by Muslim rulers in past.

Jain temple – is located little North of old Bhimnath temple

Dholeshwar Mahadev Mandir – is an ancient mandir, located further North of Jain temple complex, along River side.

Back to town center –

Shree Veneshwar Mahadev temple, dedicated to Lord Shiv –located in center of town opposite the Somnath Trust Dharamshala Gate, can also be reached Westerly from Dholeshvar mandir on a narrow path. The Rajputa "Vaja" clan was in charge of Somnath during the Muslim desecrations. As the legend goes, when Mahmud of Ghazni invaded Somnath in 1025 AD, the king gave him a tough resistance. As the king was not surrendering, Mahmud of Ghazni hatched a new plan. He found out that the king had a daughter named Veni who used to pay a visit to this Shiva Temple stationed outside the fort wall of Prabhas Patan every day. Mahmud of Ghazni decided that he would kidnap Veni and then force the king to yield. When the soldiers of Gazani attempted so later, the Shiv ling spontaneously got divided and the princess got buried into it. The Shiv temple here since then is known as "Veneshwar temple". The prints of the Veni as well as the marks of the Shiva Lingam being split open can still be seen on the Lingam here. This incredible episode of Princess Veni’s deliverance is eulogized in his novel by the prolific Gujarati novelist K M Munshi.

Gaurikund or BanGanaga - As per 68'th Adhyay of Prabhas Khund of Skund Purana, Gaurikund is named after Holy Shree Parvati Mata made Tapasya here. Once Lord Shiva comments on Pravati Maa that she looks Blackish (Kali). Little perturbed by his remark Parvati decides to do tapasya here in Prabhas. After much time the lord Shiva impressed by her tapasya tells her that she is now Gauri (the white one). She was also given a "Vardhan" that the place henceforth will be known as "Gaurishwar" and whoever worships here gets his wishes fulfilled.

Other places of interest in Somnath

Buddhist caves of Prabhas Patan are very ancient, located North West of Dholeshwar, close to highway

Mai Puri Masjid [Hazrat Maai Puri Masjid] - is located one kilometer from the Junagadh Gate which is the main gateway to Somnath from Veraval. It was originally a Hindu temple built for Sun God, and it was converted into a mosque during the period of Mohamed of Ghazni. Mai Puri Masjid is an impressive piece of architecture, covered with blue and white tiles. In its surroundings, there are several tombs that accentuate the fact that this ground belonged to the Muslim community.

Pir Haji Mangroli Shah – Tomb of Haji Mangroli Shah is a revered place for Muslims, located close to Hazrat Maai Puri Masjid. His original name was khwaja Abul Hasan baghdadi urf haji piya, and he was a is Great saint from Baghdad who came to India before Huzur Garib Nawaz.

Khwaja Miya Gulam Mohammad Masjid is another place sacred for Muslims in Somnath, located close to Daityasudan temple

Railway Station
Somnath railway station is also considered the attraction for tourists, for its unique temple-based design.

References

External links
http://tourism-of-india.com/somnath.html
http://www.gujaratplus.com/web/gujarat/info/pilgrim/pilgrim2.html

Hindu holy cities
History of Gujarat
Archaeological sites in Gujarat
Gir Somnath district